Desert Pines High School is a public high school in Las Vegas, Nevada, United States, and is a part of the Clark County School District. The school which opened in 1999, also houses the Academy of Information Technology and the Academy of Communications.

Academy of Information Technology 
The Academy of Information Technology at Desert Pines is a magnet program that educates students on the products, service, and implementation of information technology. Students enrolled in the academy learn about hardware (CyberCore, tech support, and computer forensics), software (programming, web development, and ORACLE), as well as networks (Cisco, Novell, etc.). After graduating from the program, students receive industry recognized certifications in A+, Cisco, Java, and ORACLE.

Extracurricular activities

JROTC
Desert Pines is home to one of the two Junior Reserve Officers' Training Corps units in the Clark County School District (the other being at Basic High School).

Athletics 
The athletic programs at Desert Pines are known as the Jaguars and participate in the Northeast Division in the Sunrise 4A Region.  The Jaguars football team have made the playoffs and as always show strong players, but did not have much success until the 2016 season. On Saturday, November 19, 2016, the Desert Pines varsity football team beat Spring Creek High School in the 3A high school football state championship game with a score of 39-6.

Notable alumni
 Nate Grimes (born 1996), basketball player
 Pierre Jackson, basketball player
 Julian Jacobs, basketball player
 Tony Fields II, football player
 Darnell Washington (born 2001), football player

References

External links 

Clark County School District
Educational institutions established in 1999
High schools in Las Vegas
Public high schools in Nevada
Magnet schools in Nevada
1999 establishments in Nevada